The Bureau of Firearms is a bureau of the Division of Law Enforcement of the California Department of Justice responsible for education, regulation, and enforcement relating to manufacture, sales, ownership, safety training, and transfer of firearms. The Bureau of Firearms was established in September 1999, originally the Firearms Division, reorganized into the Bureau of Firearms in April 2007. Bureau of Firearms staff provide firearms expertise and information to law enforcement, legislators, and the general public. , the bureau is headed by Director Luis Lopez.

See also
California Highway Patrol
Bureau of Alcohol, Tobacco, Firearms and Explosives

References

External links
 

Bureau of Firearms